The Return of Cagliostro is a 2003 Italian mockumentary-comedy film directed by Daniele Ciprì and Franco Maresco.

For his performance in this film and in Break Free Luigi Maria Burruano received a special mention from the Pasinetti Award jury at the 2003 Venice Film Festival.

Plot 
In the immediate post-war Sicily the La Marca brothers, owners of a sacred craft company, set up, with the consent of the Archbishop of Palermo Cardinal Sucato, the Trinacria House of Film Production, which they intend it should be the "beginning of a Sicilian Hollywood". The first films, played by non-professional actors, badly rehearsed and directed, are commercial disasters, and so to revive the fortunes of the company they have the idea to make a film about the life of Cagliostro, engaging Errol Douglas, an alcoholic Hollywood star whose career is going into sharp decline, in the title role.

Cast 
Luigi Maria Burruano: Carmelo La Marca
Robert Englund: Erroll Douglas
Franco Scaldati: Salvatore La Marca
Pietro Giordano: Cardinal Sucato / Pino Grisanti
Margareth Woodhouse: Elizabeth Burnett

References

External links

2003 films
Italian mockumentary films
2000s mockumentary films
Films about films
Films about Alessandro Cagliostro
2003 comedy films